Abbreviations referring to organisations:
 Pacific DC Intertie, also known as Path 65
Democratic Party of Côte d'Ivoire - African Democratic Rally, (in French: Parti Démocratique de la Côte d'Ivoire), a political party in Côte d'Ivoire
Partners for Democratic Change International, an international NGO network promoting democracy and civic education
Partito dei Comunisti Italiani, a political party in Italy
Perth District Collegiate Institute, a secondary school in Perth, Ontario, Canada.